Tons can refer to:

 Tons River, a major river in India
 Tamsa River, locally called Tons in its lower parts (Allahabad district, Uttar pradesh, India).
 the plural of ton, a unit of mass, force, volume, energy or power
 short ton, 2,000 pounds, used in the United States
 long ton, 2,240 pounds, used in countries such as United Kingdom which use the imperial system
 metric ton, also known as tonne, 1,000 kilograms, or 2,204.6 pounds
 Tons (band), an American rock band

See also
 Ton (disambiguation)